White Picacho is a summit with an elevation of  in the Hieroglyphic Mountains in Yavapai County, Arizona.

The White Picacho pegmatite district is a historic mining district located in southern Yavapai and northern Maricopa counties. The mines of the district are located to the southwest of White Picacho and adjacent Red Picacho peaks some seven miles east of Wickenburg. The district is noted for production of niobium, feldspar, tantalum, tungsten, beryllium, mica, bismuth, lithium, lead, gold, zinc, vanadium, molybdenum and rare-earth elements.

References

Landforms of Yavapai County, Arizona
Mountains of Arizona
Mountains of Yavapai County, Arizona